Arakkonam division is a revenue division in the Ranipet district of Tamil Nadu, India. It comprises the taluks of Arakkonam, Nemili, Walajapet, and Arcot.

References
 

Vellore district